Wollaston is an incorporated township in Hastings County, Ontario, Canada. The township had a population of 670 in the Canada 2016 Census.

Property taxes provide the primary source of income for the township accounting for 61% of the revenue required to balance the 2017 budget. Another major source of revenue for the township was provincial funding via the Ontario Municipality Partnership Fund (OMPF) which provided approximately 80% of non-tax revenue. The Township's mayor Brandon Carter has stood behind the fund since it was first introduced, and has gone on record stating " This fund keeps the town alive".

This revenue provides the income to fund municipal programs. Among these programs is the Community Improvement Plan, the goal of which is to "promote the co-ordinated [sic] implementation of community planning and land use planning programs  maintenance, rehabilitation and redevelopment of the physical, social, and economic environments."

Communities
The township of Wollaston comprises a number of villages and hamlets, including the following communities such as Coe Hill and The Ridge

Coe Hill
Coe Hill is the main community in Wollaston Township and is located approximately 230 km (143 miles) north-east of Toronto. While referred to as the Hamlet of Coe Hill, it is not truly a hamlet in the strictest British meaning of the word  as there are two churches located within the village; the Coe Hill Gospel Church and the Coe Hill United Church.

The local post office serves residents with lock boxes and four rural routes, two of which are for a neighbouring village, Gilmour in Tudor and Cashel Township. Wollaston Township Road 620 is the main road that runs through the community, connecting it to Highways 28 to the west and 62 to the east.

Coe Hill is named after William Pardee Coe, originally from Norfolk, England, and was incorporated in 1880. Original names for this community were Salem, Welch Corners and Coe Hill Mines.

In 1882, iron-ore deposits were discovered in the area. Coe, who was living in Madoc, Ontario at the time, formed the Coe Hill Mines company to commercialize these newly discovered deposits. Coe was also instrumental in getting the Central Ontario Railway (COR) to build a line that reached Coe Hill in 1884. Shipments began that same year. However, once the shipments were analyzed, it was discovered that the ore was too low-grade to be mined viably leading to the near bankruptcy of the Coe Hill Mines company. William Coe died in 1891 and is interred at the Lakeview Cemetery in Madoc.

With the failure of mining in the area, the main economic focus turned to lumber. Coe Hill remained the primary shipping point for the Rathburn Lumber company. Up to 100 loads of lumber a day were shipped south on the COR.  The rail lines have now been abandoned, but have been repurposed as hiking, biking, and snowmobile trails that are used throughout the year. The old Coe Hill railway station still exists and is currently located on the grounds of the annual Coe Hill Fair.

There are several restaurants and shops along the main street offering arts and crafts, a range of services including a garage and a fully licensed bar complete with summertime patio. There is also a well-stocked grocery store and a Liquor Control Board of Ontario (LCBO) outlet often referred to as the "liquor trailer."

Wollaston Lake - Ontario

There are many lakes within Wollaston township including: King Lake, Bear Lake, and Snow Lake. However, the largest lake in the township lies just adjacent to Coe Hill: Wollaston Lake This lake should not be confused with Wollaston Lake in Saskatchewan. Although Wollaston Lake is the largest lake in the township, it is still relatively small, approximately 6.5 kilometres long and covering just 360 hectares. It is a deep coldwater lake deemed "at capacity" with a maximum depth of 31.1 meters (102.03 feet) and a mean depth of 9.4 meters (30.84 feet). The five principal fish species in the lake are lake trout, largemouth and smallmouth bass, northern pike, and walleye. Other nuisance species include rock bass and northern sunfish.

Seasonal cottages provide the largest part of the population on the lake, although some cottage owners have winterized cottages that they utilize year-round. The lake is serviced by two camp grounds, a public boat launch, and a public beach that is maintained by the township.

Activities

Coe Hill Agricultural Fair

The Coe Hill Agriculture Fair was founded in 1882 and is held every year on the last weekend of August The first year, the fair was held in Salem, but moved to Coe Hill the following year where there were exhibits in the town hall. It was not until the early 1900s that the fair was moved to its current location at the Coe Hill Agricultural Fair grounds on Township Road 620 on the east side of town. In 1920, the grandstand was built, and in 1969, the Canadian National Railroad (formerly the COR) station was moved to the grounds.

Some of the activities at the fair include: a midway (carnival rides), agricultural and horticultural competitions, rodeo events, a demolition derby, live music, and of course food.

Canada Day

Every July 1, Coe Hill celebrates Canada Day with a parade through the main street and a fireworks display on nearby Wollaston Lake. For such a small village, the fireworks display is very good and is often better than those of the bigger town of Bancroft, some 30 km north.

Royal Canadian Legion

On the main street, almost in the very middle of town, lies the Royal Canadian Legion - Branch 581 building. The Legion hosts a community supper at the end of each month as well as a range of weekly activities, such as: darts, euchre, chair volleyball, fitness classes, yoga, and BINGO. There is also a fitness facility located on site, though, unfortunately, the fitness facility closed a couple years ago.

Demographics 

Mother tongue (per 2016 census):
 English as first language: 94.7%
 French as first language: 0.8%
 Other as first language: 4.5%

See also
List of townships in Ontario

References

Other map sources:

External links

Township municipalities in Ontario
Lower-tier municipalities in Ontario
Municipalities in Hastings County